The Vietnam Air Services Company, commonly recognized by its abbreviation VASCO, is an airline headquartered in Tân Bình, Ho Chi Minh City, Vietnam. A fully owned subsidiary of Vietnam Airlines, it mainly operates regional scheduled flights on behalf of Vietnam Airlines. It also conducts charter flights, medical evacuations, SAR operations, oil platforms flights, and other aviation services.

VASCO was established by government directive in 1987, and was originally a part of Vietnam Airlines, the national carrier. It began scheduled passenger flights independently of Vietnam Airlines in 2004, and approval has been given for it to be partially privatized. It has been reported that Vietnam Airlines wishes to use VASCO as a basis for a low-cost carrier, established in conjunction with foreign partners.

Destinations

As of 2019, VASCO currently flies to ten destinations in Vietnam.

Fleet

As of April 2019, VASCO fleet consists of the following aircraft :

Former fleets
Here are the list of fleets formerly operated by VASCO.
 Antonov An-2
 Antonov An-30
 BAE Jetstream

Restructuring and rebranding
It is believed that Vietnam Airlines, VASCO's parent company, wants to change the airline into a low-cost model, therefore changing VASCO's operational name to Viet Air. It is also believed that the airline would be serving domestic flights within Vietnam to destinations that are low-yielding as well as competing head on with Jetstar Pacific and VietJet Air. Vietnam Airlines would add more aircraft to VASCO's fleet if the plans are materialized.

In April, 2016, Vietnam Airlines announced the establishment of the new VNĐ300 billion (US$13.4 million) airline in the previous month, based on the restructuring of its subsidiary, VASCO, to a new brand: SkyViet. However, in 2017, the plan was ultimately cancelled due to the requests from the stakeholders.

See also

Indochina Airlines
Pacific Airlines
Southern Service Flight Company
Transport in Vietnam
VietJet Air

References

External links

Official website
Official website 

Airlines of Vietnam
Vietnam Airlines
Government-owned companies of Vietnam
Vietnamese companies established in 1987
Airlines established in 1987